Peepee or Pee Pee may refer to:

 Slang for penis (usually the human penis) or urine
 Pee Pee Creek, a stream in Ohio
 Pee Pee Island, island in Newfoundland
 Pee Pee Township, Pike County, Ohio
 Dr. PeePee, former alias of Kevin "PPMD" Nanney, professional Super Smash Bros. Melee player
 "Pee Pee", a song by M Huncho from the album Huncholini the 1st (2020)

See also
 Peepeekisis Cree Nation
 Pee (disambiguation)
 Pipi (disambiguation)
 PP (disambiguation)